Doctor's Orders is a Star Trek: The Original Series novel written by Diane Duane.

Plot
In response to good-natured complaints about his command style, Captain Kirk leaves Doctor McCoy in command of the Enterprise. Kirk beams down to the planet 'Flyspeck' in order to facilitate its acceptance into the Federation. Kirk soon vanishes, leaving McCoy stuck with the ship against his will; regulations forbid him from passing on command to Commander Spock.

Kirk is nowhere to be found and to complicate matters, the Klingons show up, claiming to have a stake in 'Flyspeck' as well. It is later found that Kirk had been lost in the time stream, as one of Flyspeck's races do not fully live in linear time.

References

External links

Novels based on Star Trek: The Original Series
1990 American novels
American science fiction novels
Novels about time travel